Rolling Up the Welcome Mat is the second extended play (EP) by American country pop singer Kelsea Ballerini. It was released on February 14, 2023, by Black River Entertainment.

Background
In March 2016, Ballerini began dating Australian country singer Morgan Evans. On August 29, 2022, Ballerini announced that she and Evans were divorcing. On November 3, 2022, it was revealed that Ballerini and Evans had reached a settlement agreement and their divorce was finalized on November 15, 2022.

On February 13, 2023, Ballerini announced through her social media that she would be releasing Rolling Up the Welcome Mat as a surprise release that night, coinciding with Valentine's Day. 

On March 4, 2023, Ballerini sang "Blindsided" and "Penthouse" on Saturday Night Live.

Film

The release of the EP was accompanied by a 20-minute short film acting as a visual album for the EP, written by Ballerini and co-directed by Patrick Tracy. The film portrays a woman, played by Ballerini, going through the stages of grief and acceptance to the end of a marriage and an impending divorce.

Track listing

Personnel
 Kelsea Ballerini – lead vocals, production (all tracks), background vocals (tracks 1–5)
 Alysa Vanderheym – production, digital editing, (all tracks), programming (1–5), background vocals (1, 5), engineering (4, 6)
 Andrew Mendelson – mastering
 Dan Grech-Marguerat – mixing
 Mike Stankiewicz – engineering (1–3, 5)
 Zach Kuhlman – engineering assistance (1–3, 5)
 Andrew Darby – mastering assistance
 Jacob Friga – mastering assistance
 Luke Armentrout – mastering assistance
 Taylor Chadwick – mastering assistance
 Charles Haydon Hicks – mixing assistance
 Luke Burgoyne – mixing assistance

Charts

References 

Kelsea Ballerini albums
Black River Entertainment albums
2023 EPs